The 1984 Samoa National League, or also known as the Upolo First Division, was the 6th edition of the Samoa National League, the top league of the Football Federation Samoa. Kiwi F.C. won their first title, eventually becoming the first in a three title streak.

FOPA and YFC were both relegated to the 1985 Samoa Division 2.

Standings

Promotion / relegation playoffs

References

Samoa National League seasons
Samoa
football